Chintakayala Ayyanna Patrudu (born 4 September 1957) is a politician from Andhra Pradesh. He was elected to the Andhra Pradesh Legislative Assembly several times from Narsipatnam Constituency.

Early life 
Patrudu was born in Velama Community Family at Narsipatnam in the Visakhapatnam district. He earned a bachelor's degree in Arts from PR Government College, Kakinada, in 1978.

Rise in the party and political career 
He started politics as a member of Telugu Desam Party. Later, he was nominated as the Candidate of TDP for Narsipatnam constituency in Visakhapatnam district.
He was elected to the  Andhra Pradesh Legislative Assembly from the same constituency, on a Telugu Desam Party ticket for six terms—1983–88, 1994–96, 1999–2009 and 2014. He was also elected as a member of parliament during 1996–98 from Anakapalli constituency. He lost the election from same MLA constituency during 1989–93, 2009 and in 2019 and he served as a Cabinet minister in Government of Andhra Pradesh from 2014 -19.

References

India MPs 1996–1997
Telugu politicians
Living people
1956 births
Politicians from Visakhapatnam
Lok Sabha members from Andhra Pradesh
Telugu Desam Party politicians